Westermann is a surname meaning "man from the West". Notable people with the surname include:
Antoine Westermann (born 1946), French chef
Bernt Wilhelm Westermann (1781–1868), Danish businessman and entomologist
Christine Westermann (born 1948), radio and TV host
Claus Westermann (1909–2000), German Protestant theologian
Diedrich Westermann (1875–1956), German missionary, ethnographer and African linguist
François Joseph Westermann (1751–1794), Alsace-born French general and political figure of the French Revolution
George Westermann (1810–1879), German publisher
Gerhard Westermann (1880–1971), Dutch artist
H. C. Westermann (1922–1981), American sculptor
Hans Westermann (1890–1935), German communist politician (KPD) and member of the resistance
Heiko Westermann (born 1983), German football player
Léo Westermann (born 1992), French basketball player
Liesel Westermann (born 1944), German athlete
William Linn Westermann (1873–1954), American historian

See also
Westermann (disambiguation)
Westerman
Westman (disambiguation)
Vestermans

German-language surnames